Scott Ogden (born 16 October 2003) is an English Grand Prix motorcycle racer, competing in his inaugural Moto3 World Championship for Michael Laverty's VisionTrack Racing Team during 2022.

He won the Motostar Moto3 (Standard) British Championship in 2019, and spent 2020 and 2021 in the Spanish (CEV) Junior World Championship.

Career

Moto3 World Championship

Ogden crashed out of the first Moto3 race of the season at Losail on lap seven of 18, when running in 19th place. In the second race at Mandalika, he scored three points with a 13th-place finish.

In the third race of the season at Argentina on 3 April, Ogden failed to finish the race, pitting six laps before the end. For the fourth race of the season at Circuit of the Americas near Austin, Texas on 10 April, Ogden finished in 12th position, scoring four championship points.

At the fifth event held at Portimao, Portugal, in April, Ogden finished thirteenth.

Career statistics

British Talent Cup

Races by year

(key) (Races in bold indicate pole position; races in italics indicate fastest lap)

Red Bull MotoGP Rookies Cup

Races by year
(key) (Races in bold indicate pole position; races in italics indicate fastest lap)

FIM CEV Moto3 Junior World Championship

Races by year
(key) (Races in bold indicate pole position, races in italics indicate fastest lap)

Grand Prix motorcycle racing

By season

By class

Races by year
(key) (Races in bold indicate pole position; races in italics indicate fastest lap)

References

External links
 

2003 births
Living people
Sportspeople from Doncaster
English motorcycle racers
Moto3 World Championship riders